Carlston is a surname and given name.

Surname
 Doug Carlston (born 1947), software publisher
 Erin G. Carlston (born 1962), New Zealand academic
 Pete Carlston (1911 – 1992), athletic coach and military officer

Given name
Carlston Harris (born 1987). Guyanese mixed martial artist

See also

Carleton (given name)
Carlson (name)
Carlston (disambiguation)
Carlton (name)
Carlsson
Carlsten (name)
Charleston (name)